Roy Akira Miki,  (born 10 October 1942) is a Canadian poet, scholar, editor, and activist most known for his social and literary work.

Born in Ste. Agathe, Manitoba to second generation Japanese-Canadian parents, Miki grew up on a sugar beet farm before moving to Winnipeg. His family was forcibly relocated West to Manitoba where he was born in 1942 on said sugar beet farm, and interned during the Second World War. He earned his B.A. from the University of Manitoba, M.A. from the Simon Fraser University, and Ph.D. from the University of British Columbia. Miki taught contemporary literature at Simon Fraser University before retiring and holds the title of professor emeritus. He lives in Vancouver. In the 1980s, Miki was a "instrumental" in fighting for redress from the federal government for the internment of Japanese-Canadians during the Second World War.

In 2002, Miki's book of poetry, Surrender, won the Governor General's Literary Award for poetry. His poetry focuses on questions about identity, citizenship, race, and place. He is the author of the critical study, Broken Entries: Race, Subjectivity, Writing (1998), In Flux: Transnational Shifts in Asian Canadian Writing (2011), The Prepoetics of William Carlos Williams (1983), and an annotated bibliography of the poet and novelist George Bowering (1990).

In 2006, Miki was made a Member of the Order of Canada and received the 20th annual Gandhi Peace Award for the truth, justice, human rights, and non-violence exemplified in his redress work. The same year, he also received the Thakore Visiting Scholar award and the Sterling Prize in Support of Controversy. In 2007, he was made a Fellow of the Royal Society of Canada. In 2009, he was made a Member of the Order of British Columbia.

Works

Poetry
 1991: Saving Face: Poems Selected, 1976–1988, Winnipeg: Turnstone Press
 1995: Random Access File, Markham, ON: Red Deer Press
 2001: Surrender, Toronto: The Mercury Press, winner of the 2002 Governor General's Award for poetry
 2006: There, Vancouver: New Star Books
 2011: Mannequin Rising, Vancouver: New Star Books
 2018: Flow: Poems Collected and New (edited by Michael Barnholden), Vancouver: Talonbooks

Critical studies
 1983: The Prepoetics of William Carlos Williams, Ann Arbor: UMI Research Press
 1988: Tracing the Paths: Reading ≠ Writing The Martyrology, Vancouver: Talonbooks
 1989: A Record of Writing: An Annotated and Illustrated Bibliography of George Bowering, Vancouver: Talonbooks 
 2004: Redress: Inside the Japanese Canadian Call for Justice, Vancouver: Raincoast Books

Editor
1985: This Is My Own: Letters to Wes and Other Writings on Japanese-Canadians, 1941–1948 by Muriel Kitagawa, Vancouver: Talonbooks
1997: Pacific Windows: The Collected Poems of Roy Kiyooka, Vancouver: Talonbooks

Other
 1998: Broken Entries: Race, Subjectivity, Writing (Essays), Toronto: The Mercury Press

References

External links
 Roy Akira Miki at The Canadian Encyclopedia

1942 births
Living people
20th-century Canadian poets
Canadian male poets
Japanese-Canadian internees
Fellows of the Royal Society of Canada
Members of the Order of British Columbia
Members of the Order of Canada
People from Eastman Region, Manitoba
Academic staff of Simon Fraser University
Simon Fraser University alumni
University of Manitoba alumni
Writers from Manitoba
Governor General's Award-winning poets
Canadian writers of Asian descent
21st-century Canadian poets
20th-century Canadian male writers
21st-century Canadian male writers